Grove United Football Club is a Northern Irish intermediate football club playing in Division 1A of the Northern Amateur Football League. The club hails from north Belfast and began life as the 40th (Belfast BB) Old Boys, and was also known as Jennymount, changing its name in 1985. The club has enjoyed intermediate status since 1997. They are based at the Shore Road playing fields in the Greencastle suburb, a ground they share with Malachians.

Honours

Intermediate honours
Clarence Cup: 1
1987–88
Border Cup: 1
2009–10
UEFA Champions League 2010

Junior honours
County Antrim Junior Shield: 4
1983–84, 1984–85, 1996–96, 1996–97

Notes

External links 
 nifootball.co.uk - (For fixtures, results and tables of all Northern Ireland amateur football leagues)

Association football clubs in Northern Ireland
Association football clubs in Belfast
Northern Amateur Football League clubs